Qarneh (also Romanized as Qārneh) is a village in Jarqavieh Sofla Rural District, Jarqavieh Sofla District, Isfahan County, Isfahan Province, Iran. At the 2006 census, its population was 74, in 25 families.

References 

Populated places in Isfahan County